Kheyrabad (also Romanized as Kheyrābād and Khairābād; also known as Kheir Abad Khoosaf) is a village in Qaleh Zari Rural District, Jolgeh-e Mazhan District, Khusf County, South Khorasan Province, Iran. At the 2006 census, its population was 48 people a part of 14 families.

References 

Populated places in Khusf County